Elizabeth "Eliza" Lucas Pinckney (December 28, 1722  May 27, 1793) transformed agriculture in colonial South Carolina, where she developed indigo as one of its most important cash crops. Its cultivation and processing as dye produced one-third the total value of the colony's exports before the Revolutionary War. Manager of three plantations, Pinckney had a major influence on the colonial economy.

In the 20th century, Eliza Pinckney was the first woman to be inducted into South Carolina's Business Hall of Fame.

Early life and education 
Elizabeth (known as Eliza) Lucas was born on December 28, 1722, on the island of Antigua, in the colony of the British Leeward Islands in the Caribbean. Lucas grew up on Poorest, one of her family's three sugarcane plantations on the island. She was the eldest child of Lieutenant Colonel George Lucas, of Dalzell's Regiment of Foot in the British Army, and Ann (probably Meldrum) Lucas. She had two brothers, Thomas, and George, and a younger sister Mary (known to her family as Polly). 

Colonel and Mrs. Lucas sent all their children to London for schooling. It was customary for elite colonists to send boys to England for their education when they might be as young as 8 or 9. Girls would not be sent until their mid-teens when nearing marriageable age. During this period, many parents believed that girls' futures of being wives and mothers made education in more than "the three Rs" and social accomplishments less necessary. But Eliza's ability was recognized. She treasured her education at boarding school, where studies included French and music, but she said her favorite subject was botany. She wrote to her father that she felt her "education, which [she] esteems a more valuable fortune than any [he] could have given [her], … Will make me happy in my future life."

Move to South Carolina and career
In 1738, the year Eliza would turn 16, Colonel Lucas moved his family from Antigua to South Carolina, where he had inherited three plantations from his father. With tensions increasing between Spain and England, he believed his family would be safer in Carolina than on the tiny, exposed island in the West Indies. Eliza's grandfather, John Lucas, had acquired three tracts of land: Garden Hill on the Combahee River (1,500 acres), another 3,000 acres on the Waccamaw River, and Wappoo Plantation (600 acres) on Wappoo Creek—a tidal creek that connected the Ashley and Stono Rivers. They chose to reside at Wappoo, which was 17 miles by land to Charleston (then known as Charles Town) and six miles by river. 
    
In 1739, Colonel Lucas had to return to his post in Antigua to deal with the political conflict between England and Spain. He was appointed lieutenant governor of the island. England's involvement in the War of the Austrian Succession thwarted his attempts to move back to South Carolina with his family. Eliza's letters to him show that she regarded her father with great respect and deep affection, and demonstrated that she acted as head of the family in terms of managing the plantations. Her mother died shortly after they moved.
 
Eliza was 16 years old when she became responsible for managing Wappoo Plantation and its twenty slaves, plus supervising overseers at two other Lucas plantations, one inland producing tar and timber, and a  rice plantation on the Waccamaw River. In addition, she supervised care for her extremely young sister, as their two brothers were still in school in London. As was customary, she recorded her decisions and experiments by copying letters in a letter book. This letter book is one of the most impressive collections of personal writings of an 18th-century American woman. It gives insight into her mind and into the society of the time.

From Antigua, Colonel Lucas sent Eliza various types of seeds for trial on the plantations. They and other planters were eager to find crops for the uplands that could supplement their cultivation of rice. First, she experimented with ginger, cotton, alfalfa and hemp. Starting in 1739, she began experimenting with cultivating and improving strains of the indigo plant, for which the expanding textile market created demand for its dye. When Colonel Lucas sent Eliza indigofera seeds in 1740, she expressed her "greater hopes" for them, as she intended to plant them earlier in the season. In experimenting with growing indigo in new climate and soil, Lucas also made use of knowledge and skills of enslaved Africans who had grown indigo in the West Indies and West Africa.

After three years of persistence and many failed attempts, Eliza proved that indigo could be successfully grown and processed in South Carolina. While she had first worked with an indigo processing expert from Montserrat, she was most successful in processing dye with the expertise of an indigo-maker of African descent whom her father hired from the French West Indies.

Eliza used her 1744 crop to make seed and shared it with other planters, leading to an expansion in indigo production. She proved that colonial planters could make a profit in an extremely competitive market. Due to her successes, the volume of indigo dye exported increased dramatically from 5,000 pounds in 1745–46, to 130,000 pounds by 1748. Indigo became second only to rice as the South Carolina colony's commodity cash crop, and contributed greatly to the wealth of its planters. Before the Revolutionary War, indigo accounted for more than one-third of the value of exports from the American colonies.

Her writings
From the time that she began her life in South Carolina on Wappoo Plantation to the time that she died in Philadelphia in 1793, Eliza carefully copied all her conversations and letters into a "letter-book." She organized her writings into multiple volumes, each depicting with great detail a different period during her life. The volumes recount most of her life, with the bulk of her writings referring to the time between 1739 and 1762.

The first few volumes range from the years 1739 to 1746. They begin with her description of her family's move to the plantation in South Carolina when she was about 17 years old. Throughout these years, she began to experiment with the indigo seeds along with others that her father had sent to her. Her letters describe the many years of experiments that she did on the crop to make it successful. They also detail her marriage to longtime friend and neighbor Charles Pinckney in 1744.

The second set of volumes begins around 1753 and ends around 1757. By this time, Eliza and Charles had begun their new life together and had children. These sets reference the time she and her family moved to London for her husband's job. They lived there for about five years while Charles worked as the commissioner of the South Carolina colony.

The third set of volumes covers 1758 through 1762. It corresponds with the family's return to South Carolina and soon after, the death of her husband. She was in charge of overseeing her family's plantations along with her late husband's as well. She lived as a widow for more than thirty years until her death in 1793 while she was searching for a cure for breast cancer. Though she continued to keep copies of her letters after her husband died, very few of them remain today.

This letter-book is one of the most complete collections of writing from 18th century America and provides a valuable glimpse into the life of an elite colonial woman living during this time period. Her writings detail goings on at the plantations, her pastimes, social visits, and even her experiments with indigo over several years. Many scholars consider this letter-book extremely precious because it describes everyday life over an extended period of time rather than a singular event in history. Eliza passed her letter-book on to her daughter Harriott, who in turn passed it to her daughter. It was passed down from mother to daughter well into the 20th century, at which point the Lucas-Pinckney family donated it to the South Carolina Historical Society.

Marriage and family
Eliza knew independence at a very young age. Her determination to stay independent carried over into her personal life. George Lucas, Eliza's father, presented two potential suitors—both wealthy, connected, South Carolina socialites—to Eliza in the years before she fell in love with and married Charles Pinckney. Eliza rejected both suitors. This was very strange and even unheard of in 18th-century colonial America.

Eliza and Charles Pinckney, a planter on a neighboring plantation, became attached after the death of his first wife. Eliza had been very close to the couple before his wife's death. They were married on May 25, 1744. She was 22 years old and took her family responsibilities seriously, vowing:

to make a good wife to my dear Husband in all its several branches; to make all my actions Correspond with that sincere love and Duty I bear him… I am resolved to be a good mother to my children, to pray for them, to set them good examples, to give them good advice, to be careful both of their souls and bodies, to watch over their tender minds.

Mr. Pinckney had studied law in England and had become a politically active leader in the colony. He was South Carolina's first native-born attorney, and served as advocate general of the Court of Vice-Admiralty, justice of the peace for Berkeley County, and attorney general. He was elected as a member of the Commons House of Assembly and Speaker of that body intermittently from 1736 to 1740, and he was a member of the Royal Provincial Council. Eliza was unlike many women of her time, as she was "educated, independent, and accomplished." When the Pinckneys lived in Charleston, Eliza was soon planting oaks and magnolias at their mansion overlooking the bay, and corresponding regularly with major British botanists.

Eliza soon gave birth to three sons and a daughter: Charles Cotesworth (1746–1825), George Lucas, Harriott Pinckney (1749–1830), and Thomas (1750–1828). George Lucas Pinckney, her father's namesake, died soon after birth in June 1747. 

In 1753, the family moved to London for five years. Shortly after their return in 1758 to South Carolina, Charles Pinckney contracted malaria and died. Widowed, Eliza continued to manage their extensive plantations, in addition to the Lucas holdings. Most of her agricultural experiments took place before this time.

The surviving Pinckney sons became influential leaders. Charles was a signatory of the United States Constitution and was the Federalist vice-presidential candidate in 1800. In 1804 and 1808, he was the Federalist candidate for president. Thomas was appointed Minister to Spain, where he negotiated Pinckney's Treaty in 1795, guaranteeing American navigation rights on the Mississippi River to New Orleans. He was the Federalist vice presidential candidate in 1796. Harriott married Daniel Huger Horry, Jr. and lived at Hampton Plantation, now a South Carolina State Historic Site. 

Eliza Lucas Pinckney died of cancer, in Philadelphia in 1793.

At the end of the 17th century, Antiguan political opponents of Eliza's grandfather, John Lucas, believed that the Lucas family had powerful influence in London through Henry Grey (1664–1740), later Duke of Kent, a senior member of Queen Anne's government; and Robert Lucas, 3rd Lord Lucas (1649–1705), then governor of the Tower of London. There is documentary evidence that the family used this influence for their own purposes. The West India merchant Thomas Lucas (c.1720–1784) and his business partner William Coleman were prominent. But, no researcher has documented a "blood" relationship between any of these men and the Antigua and South Carolina family.

Honors and legacy
1989 - For her contributions to South Carolina's agriculture, Eliza Lucas Pinckney was the first woman to be inducted into the South Carolina Business Hall of Fame.
1793 - President George Washington served as a pallbearer at her funeral at St. Peter's Church, in Philadelphia where she had traveled for treatment. 
1753 - At an audience with Augusta, the Dowager Princess of Wales, in London, Eliza presented the princess with a dress made of silk produced on the Pinckney plantations.

Further reading
South Carolina Historical Magazine, Vol. 99:3 (July 1998). Special issue on Eliza Lucas Pinckney, featuring three academic articles and three previously unpublished letters.
"Eliza Lucas Pinckney", in G. J. Barker Benfield and Catherine Clinton, eds., Portraits of American Women: From Settlement to the Present, New York: Oxford University Press, 1998.
Glover, Lorri. Eliza Lucas Pinckney: An Independent Woman in the Age of Revolution, New Haven, Conn. Yale University Press, 2020.
Ravenel, Harriott Horry. Eliza Pinckney, New York: Scribner's, 1896.
Nicolson, Adam. The Gentry, chapter 'Courage', London, 2011.
Williams III, Roy, and Alexander Lucas Lofton.  Rice to Ruin: Saga of the Lucas Family, 1783-1929 (U of South Carolina Press, 2018)

References

1722 births
1793 deaths
American agronomists
American agricultural writers
American planters
Indigo structure dyes
South Carolina colonial people
People of pre-statehood South Carolina
Pinckney family
British emigrants to the United States
Businesspeople from South Carolina
18th-century American businesspeople
18th-century American scientists
18th-century American women scientists
18th-century American writers
18th-century American women writers
Burials at St. Peter's churchyard, Philadelphia
American slave owners
American women non-fiction writers
18th-century American businesswomen
18th-century American landowners
American women landowners
American women slave owners